= List of windmills in England =

The list of windmills in England is split by county:
